The 1954 Philadelphia Athletics season involved the A's finishing eighth in the American League with a record of 51 wins and 103 losses, 60 games behind AL Champion Cleveland in their 54th and final season in Philadelphia, before moving to Kansas City, Missouri for the following season.

Offseason 
 February 19, 1954: Dave Philley was traded by the Athletics to the Cleveland Indians for Bill Upton and Lee Wheat.

Regular season 
The Athletics played the Philadelphia Phillies for the last time in their Philadelphia City Series on June 28, 1954 in the seventh annual Junior Baseball Federation of Philadelphia benefit exhibition game. The Phillies beat the Athletics 3 to 2 in 7 innings in front of 15,993 fans.

Season standings

Record vs. opponents

Notable transactions 
 June 11, 1954: Morrie Martin and Ed McGhee were traded by the Athletics to the Chicago White Sox for Sonny Dixon, Al Sima, Bill Wilson, and $20,000.

Player stats

Batting

Starters by position 
Note: Pos = Position; G = Games played; AB = At bats; H = Hits; Avg. = Batting average; HR = Home runs; RBI = Runs batted in

Other batters 
Note: G = Games played; AB = At bats; H = Hits; Avg. = Batting average; HR = Home runs; RBI = Runs batted in

Pitching

Starting pitchers 
Note: G = Games pitched; IP = Innings pitched; W = Wins; L = Losses; ERA = Earned run average; SO = Strikeouts

Other pitchers 
Note: G = Games pitched; IP = Innings pitched; W = Wins; L = Losses; ERA = Earned run average; SO = Strikeouts

Relief pitchers 
Note: G = Games pitched; W = Wins; L = Losses; SV = Saves; ERA = Earned run average; SO = Strikeouts

Farm system

References

External links
1954 Philadelphia Athletics at Baseball Reference
1954 Philadelphia Athletics at Baseball Almanac

Oakland Athletics seasons
Philadelphia Athletics season
Oak